Włodzimierz may refer to the following :

People 
 Włodzimierz (given name), a Polish variant of the (East) Slavic name Vladimir

Places and jurisdictions 
 Włodzimierz, Greater Poland Voivodeship (west-central Poland)
 Włodzimierz, Łask County in Łódź Voivodeship (central Poland)
 Włodzimierz, Radomsko County in Łódź Voivodeship (central Poland)
 Volodymyr-Volynskyi in Volyn Oblast (Western Ukraine) formerly known as Włodzimierz [Wołyński]
 Włodzimierz Voivodeship (1793)
 the former Roman Catholic Diocese of Włodzimierz (as Polish for Lodomeria alias Vladimir)

See also 
 Vladimir (name)

es:Vladimiro
ku:Vladîmîr
sk:Vladimír